Turning into Stone (Hindi: पत्थर बनने की अफवाह) was a rumour in north-India which came in the year of january 2012.

According this rumour if you sleep you will turn into stone. This rumour affects many people lives, during this rumour people use to awake till dawn. On Monday, 2 january 2012 this news came from Kanpur and it's neighbour cities.

The main culprits of this rumours were mobile phones, as people called their relatives, neighbourhood, friends, telling them not to sleep as that would to turn into stone.

In march 2020 during one day voluntary public curfew lockdown in India. This rumours again blows in Rampur, Uttar Pradesh and people got out from their homes and discussed about this rumour.

References 

Hoaxes in India
2012 in India
January 2012 events in India